The Balima is a river of New Britain, Papua New Guinea. It enters the sea about five miles from Cape Koas.
One of its tributaries is the Bumba Stream.

References

Rivers of New Britain